A Creampuff Romance is a 1916 American short comedy film directed by and starring Fatty Arbuckle.

Cast
 Roscoe 'Fatty' Arbuckle
 Alice Lake
 Al St. John

See also
 List of American films of 1916
 Fatty Arbuckle filmography

References

External links

1916 films
Films directed by Roscoe Arbuckle
1916 comedy films
1916 short films
American silent short films
American black-and-white films
Silent American comedy films
American comedy short films
1910s American films